Night vision is the ability to see in a dark environment.

Night Vision may also refer to:

 Night Vision (Bruce Cockburn album), 1973
 Night Vision (Kayak album), 2001
 "Nightvision", a song by Daft Punk from Discovery
 "Night Vision", a song by Suzanne Vega from Solitude Standing
 "Night Vision", a song by Electric Six from Switzerland
 "Night Vision", a 2014 novel by Ella West, shortlisted for the Hampshire Book Awards

See also
 Night Visions (disambiguation)
 Scotopic vision